Shi Chenglong (born 28 May 1999) is a Chinese footballer currently playing as a goalkeeper for Henan Jianye.

Club career
Shi Chenglong was promoted to the senior team of Henan Jianye within the 2020 Chinese Super League season and would make his debut in league game on 21 September 2020 against Guangzhou Evergrande in a 2-1 defeat where he came on as a substitute for Wu Yan.

Career statistics

References

External links

1999 births
Living people
Chinese footballers
Association football goalkeepers
Chinese Super League players
Henan Songshan Longmen F.C. players